Vaccinium ovalifolium (commonly known as Alaska blueberry, early blueberry, oval-leaf bilberry, oval-leaf blueberry, and oval-leaf huckleberry) is a plant in the heath family having three varieties, all of which grow in northerly regions, including the subarctic.

Growth
It has pink  urn-shaped flowers. Berries are dark blue, often black, sometimes with a waxy coating.

Distribution
The original variety (i.e. the automatically named Vaccinium ovalifolium var[iety] ovalifolium) is found on both the eastern and western sides of the Pacific Ocean; in North America, it is distributed in Canada (in Alberta, British Columbia, Newfoundland, Nova Scotia, southern Ontario, south central Quebec, and southern Yukon Territory); and the United States (in southern Alaska, Idaho, northern Michigan, Oregon, western South Dakota, and Washington); across the Pacific to Asia and Eurasia, it is distributed in Russia (in Kamchatka, the southern Kuril Islands, Primorsky Krai, and Sakhalin); and in Japan (in Hokkaido, and central and northern Honshu).

The two other varieties are confined to Japan and Russia:

V. o. var. sachalinense is only found in Sakhalin in Russia, and Hokkaido in Japan.
V. o. var. alpinum is distributed only within the Daisetsu and Hidaka Mountains, both on the island of Hokkaido.

Uses
Vaccinium ovalifolium is used in jams and jellies and for making liqueur. Blueberry herbal tea can be made from the leaves, or from the juice of the blueberries themselves.

Vaccinium ovalifolium has been used in Russia in the making of dyes, including the use of its tannin.

In the winter, Vaccinium ovalifolium  is an important food source for grazing deer, goats, and elk, and in the summer the nectar feeds hummingbirds.

References

External links
 Photo of herbarium specimen at Missouri Botanical Garden, collected in Russian America (now Alaska) in 1787, isotype of  Vaccinium ovalifolium
 Jepson eFlora (TJM2) treatment of Vaccinium ovalifolium (California huckleberry)
 Calflora taxon report, University of California: Vaccinium ovatum (California huckleberry, evergreen huckleberry)
  United States Department of Agriculture Plants Profile for Vaccinium ovatum (California huckleberry)
 Vaccinium ovalifolium — University of California, Calphotos Photos gallery
Rating Criteria for Non-Timber Quality Codes. 2010. Vaccinium ovalifolium. Common name: Mountain blueberry; oval-leaved blueberry. 1 MacKinnon, A., J. Pojar, and R. Coupe. 1992. Plants of northern British Columbia. B.C. Ministry of Forests and Long Pine Publishing. Victoria, British Columbia, Canada description, criteria for judging quality of fruit
University of Alaska @ Fairbanks, Native Plants of Alaska, Oval-leafed Blueberry photos, description, propagation information
Черника овальнолистная (Vaccinium ovalifolium, Ericaceae) in Russian with photos

ovalifolium
Flora of the Northwestern United States
Flora of Japan
Flora of the Russian Far East
Plants described in 1817
Garden plants of North America
Bird food plants
Flora of Western Canada
Flora of Eastern Canada
Flora of Alaska
Flora of Yukon
Flora of South Dakota
Flora of Michigan